En Kadamai is a 1964 Indian Tamil-language action thriller film, produced and directed by M. Natesan, and written by Ma. Ra. The film stars M. G. Ramachandran and B. Saroja Devi. It was released on 13 March 1964, and became a box-office bomb.

Plot 

Dharmalingam, a rich landlord, is the father of two sons and a daughter. His eldest son has a love marriage with a poor teacher's daughter, Kamala. Dharmalingam disowns them. The son dies, and Kamala is left homeless, with a little child. Nathan, a police inspector, gives Kamala shelter in his house and decides to help her fight her case for the property. But Kamala is murdered on the way to the court hearing. Fingers point at Dharmalingam and his son Shankar. Shankar and Nathan's sister Uma are in love. Nathan comes to investigate the case and falls in love with Dharmalingam's daughter Sarasu. Now, Nathan is in a dilemma over whether he should protect Shankar as he is his sister's sweetheart, or drop the case because he loves Dharmalingam's daughter.

Cast 

Male cast
 M. G. Ramachandran as Inspector Nathan
 K. Balaji as Ravi
 M. N. Nambiar as Shankar
 M. R. Radha as Dharmalingam
 Nagesh as Thrilokam

Female cast
 B. Saroja Devi as Sarasu
 L. Vijayalakshmi as Uma
 Manorama as Panchavarnam
 C. K. Saraswathi as Maragatham
 Susheela as Kamala

Production 
En Kadamai was produced and directed by M. Natesan under Natesh Art Pictures. The story and dialogue were written by Ma. Ra. Cinematography was handled by R. Sampath, and editing by A. Murugesan.

Soundtrack 
The soundtrack was composed by Viswanathan–Ramamoorthy (a duo consisting of M. S. Viswanathan and T. K. Ramamoorthy) with lyrics by Kannadasan.

Release and reception 
En Kadamai was released on 13 March 1964, and distributed by Emgeeyaar Pictures. T. M. Ramachandran of Sport and Pastime panned the film, calling the music its "saving grace". Playing on the film's title, Kanthan of Kalki said, "Ayyo, ennai kodumai!" (Oh god, what an atrocity!). En Kadamai was a box-office bomb; while many speculated this was due to it releasing shortly after M. G. Ramachandran resigned from the Madras Legislative Council, Ramachandran himself did not think so.

References

External links 
 

1960s action thriller films
1960s Tamil-language films
1964 films
Films scored by Viswanathan–Ramamoorthy
Indian action thriller films